Scaitcliffe was a prep school for boys aged 6–13 in Egham, Surrey. Founded in 1896, it was both a boarding and day school. After merging with Virginia Water Prep School in 1996, the school is now co-educational and known as Bishopsgate School. The school is located in a small village in Egham called Englefield Green near Windsor Great Park.

In post-war days, boys were allocated to four houses each named for British military heroes: Jellicoe, Beatty, Haig, and Kitchener.

Former pupils include Richard Branson, founder of Virgin Group; Peter Palumbo, Baron Palumbo, the former chairman of the Arts Council of Great Britain, patron of the Arts and architecture connoisseur; James Reed CBE, chairman and chief executive of the Reed group of companies, Abhisit Vejjajiva, leader of the opposition Democrat Party in Thailand, who subsequently went to Eton College and Oxford University; Charles Philipps, CEO of Amlin, who also subsequently went to Eton College; Bim Afolami, MP; Colin Tennant, 3rd Baron Glenconner; and Michael Holroyd, biographer, who describes it in his 1999 book Basil Street Blues.

References 

Boys' schools in Surrey
Defunct schools in Surrey